L. Shankar has served as an instrumentalist, composer, record producer, arranger and programmer on several recordings. He has released a number of his own recordings, in addition to appearing on other artists' albums. All credits are for violin, except where noted. This is not an exhaustive list of Shankar's works, but a select few titles.

Discography

Solo albums
 Touch Me There  (1979—Zappa Records) 
 Who's to Know (1980—ECM) 
 Vision (1983—ECM)
 Song For Everyone (1985—ECM)
 Nobody Told Me (1989—ECM)
 Pancha Nadai Pallavi (1989—ECM)
 M.R.C.S. (1989—ECM)
 Soul Searcher (1990—Axiom/Island/PolyGram)
 Raga Aberi (1995—Music of the World)
 Enlightenment (Ganesh music)
 Eternal Light (2000—Moment! Records)
 Open the Door (2007—Big Deal/Rykodisc)

DVDs
 Shankar & Gingger's One In A Million (2001 · Silverline)

with T. Viswanathan and T. Ranganathan
 Pallavi: South Indian Flute Music (1973-Nonesuch)

with Shakti
 Shakti (1975—CBS)
 A Handful of Beauty (1976—CBS) 
 Natural Elements (1977—CBS)

with The Epidemics
The Epidemics (1986) 
Do What You Do (1987)
Eye Catcher (1989)

as Shankar and Ginnger
 Shankar & Ginnger (2001)
 Celestial Body (2004 · Mondo Melodia)

Guest albums

Compilations / Box set appearances

Best of Music & Rhythm (1983) – Violin, composer, vocals, producer
ECM Spectrum, Vol. 1 (1987) – Violin, performer
 CMPler (1990) – Violin
Peter Gabriel's Shaking the Tree (1990) – Double violin
Pioneers of the New Age (1991) – Violin
Illuminations: An Axiom Compilation (1991) – Arranger, vocals, kanjira, producer, double violin
Yoko Ono's Onobox (1992) – Violin
Lou Reed's Between Thought and Expression: The Lou Reed Anthology (1992) – Electric violin 
Plus from Us (1993) – Arranger, vocals, kanjira, producer, double violin
Manifestation Axiom Collection 2 (1993) – Arranger
The Best of Shakti (1994)
Narada Michael Walden's Ecstasy's Dance: The Best of Narada (1996) – Violin
John McLaughlin's This is Jazz Vol. 17 (1996) – Violin
Phil Collins's Hits (1998) – Violin

Jewels of the Subcontinent (2000) – Performer, double violin
Asian Travels, Vol. 1: A Six Degrees Collection (2000) – Performer
Echo & the Bunnymen's Crystal Days: 1979–1999 (2001) – Strings
The Bombay Jazz Palace (2001) – Violin
Meta Collection (2002) – Violin
Asana: Soul Practice (2002) – Violin, arranger
Classical Indian Collection (2003) – Violin
Bhakti Music: Medicine Buddha (2003) – Photography
Talking Heads' Once in a Lifetime (2003) – Violin
Left of the Dial: Dispatches of the '80s Underground (2004) – Strings
Phil Collins's The Platinum Collection (2004) – Violin, tamboura
Trilok Gurtu Collection (2005) – Violin
Monterey Pop Festival (2007) – Arranger
John McLaughlin's Essential John McLaughlin (2007) – Violin

Discographies of Indian artists